is a Japanese hurdler. At the 2012 Summer Olympics, he competed in the Men's 400 metres hurdles.

He is currently the head coach at the athletics club "Run for the Future".

He married Japanese hurdler Manami Kira in May 2020.

International competition

Japanese Championships podiums

National titles
National Junior Championships
400m hurdles: 2010

National Junior High School Championships
Tetrathlon (400m, 110m hurdles, High Jump, Shot Put): 2006

References

External links

Tetsuya Tateno at JAAF 
Tetsuya Tateno at JOC 
Tetsuya Tateno at Criacao 

1991 births
Living people
Sportspeople from Ibaraki Prefecture
Japanese male hurdlers
Olympic athletes of Japan
Athletes (track and field) at the 2012 Summer Olympics
Chuo University alumni
Japanese athletics coaches
21st-century Japanese people